Alexander Rauchenwald (born 11 May 1993) is an Austrian professional ice hockey centre playing for EC VSV of the ICE Hockey League (ICEHL).

References

External links

1993 births
Living people
Austrian ice hockey centres
EC Red Bull Salzburg players
VIK Västerås HK players
EC VSV players
Austrian expatriate sportspeople in Sweden
Austrian expatriate ice hockey people
Expatriate ice hockey players in Sweden